Acanthocheilus is a genus of nematodes belonging to the family Acanthocheilidae.

The species of this genus are found in Europe and Northern America.

Species:

Acanthocheilus intermedius 
Acanthocheilus rotundatus

References

Nematodes